The Le Mans Legend is a vintage sports car race held during the 24 Hours of Le Mans festivities.  Created in 2001, it was created by the Motor Racing Legends group, and supported by the ACO, organizers of the 24 Hours of Le Mans.

Unlike other vintage events, these races only allow cars which previously ran at Le Mans.  Specific eras of cars are run each year, with the era changing each year as deemed by the organizers.  Cars run the full Circuit de la Sarthe just as they had originally done when they first raced, and are fully timed and scored based on their classes.

Famous Le Mans drivers have often driven in the event, driving cars they had previously run.  Stirling Moss was among the notables in recent years, while amateur drivers mostly make up the rest of the field.  Dr. Ulrich Bez, former CEO of Aston Martin from 2000 to 2013, has also raced in the event, driving the  winning DBR1 in 2007.  A record 61 cars were seen in the event in 2007.

Previous winners

External links
 Motor Racing Legends - Le Mans Legend organizers

Sports car races
24 Hours of Le Mans